NH 117 may refer to:

 National Highway 117 (India)
 New Hampshire Route 117, United States